Linda Lizeth Caicedo Alegría (born 25 February 2005) is a Colombian professional footballer who plays as a forward for Primera División club Real Madrid and the Colombia women's national team.

Career
She made her professional debut at age 14 with América de Cali. She was named the best player at the 2022 Copa América Femenina. Her team (Deportivo Cali) were the 2021 champions of the Liga Femenina Profesional de Fútbol Colombiano

Career statistics

Club

International

International goals

Honours 
América de Cali
 Colombian Women's Football League: 2019

Deportivo Cali
 Colombian Women's Football League: 2021

Colombia U17
 FIFA U-17 Women's World Cup runner-up: 2022
 South American U-17 Women's Championship runner-up: 2022
Colombia
 Copa América Femenina runner-up: 2022

Individual

 Copa América Femenina Golden Ball: 2022

 FIFA U-17 Women's World Cup Silver Ball: 2022
 FIFA U-17 Women's World Cup Bronze Boot: 2022
 Copa Libertadores Femenina Top scorer: 2021
 Copa Libertadores Femenina Team of the Season: 2021
 Colombian Women's Football League Top scorer: 2019

 Copa América Femenina Best XI: 2022
 Premios Fémina Fútbol Young Player of the Year: 2021
 Premios Fémina Fútbol Team of the Year: 2021
 IFFHS World's Best Youth (U20) Player: 2022

References

Living people
2005 births
2022 Copa América Femenina
Colombian women's footballers
Colombia women's international footballers
Women's association footballers not categorized by position
21st-century Colombian women